Kuie is a village in Tapa Parish, Lääne-Viru County, in northeastern Estonia.

Wooden Kuie schoolhouse from 1877/1878 was moved to Estonian Open Air Museum in Tallinn.

Gallery

References 

Villages in Lääne-Viru County